Calais Middle/High School (Calais or CMHS) is a public middle school and high school in Calais, Maine. The high school is located in Calais Education Park, near Washington County Community College, and the St. Croix Regional Technical Center.

Athletics 
CMHS has various varsity sports teams, including Baseball, Basketball, Cheering, Cross country, Golf, Soccer, Softball, Tennis, Track and field, Volleyball, and Wrestling.

Extracurriculars 
CMHS has several extracurriculars, including Student Council, Drama, Yearbook Committee, a Civil Rights Team, United States Academic Decathlon, Skills USA, Skatepark Committee, School Climate Committee, Jobs For Maine's Graduates, Band, Jazz Band, Chorus, National Honor Society, and a Math Team.

Notable alumni 

 Lyn Mikel Brown, academic, author, and activist
 Vinton Cassidy, politician
 George M. Hanson, judge
 Harold H. Murchie, judge and politician

Notable staff 
 Franklin W. Johnson, 15th president of Colby College and former principal

References

Calais, Maine
Public high schools in Maine
Schools in Washington County, Maine